The Hungarian Socialist Workers' Party (MSZMP) was the ruling Marxist–Leninist party of the Hungarian People's Republic between 1956 and 1989. It was organised from elements of the Hungarian Working People's Party during the Hungarian Revolution of 1956, with János Kádár as general secretary. The party also controlled its armed forces, the Hungarian People's Army.

Like all other Eastern Bloc parties, the MSZMP was organized on the basis of democratic centralism, a principle conceived by Vladimir Lenin that entails democratic and open discussion of issues within the party followed by the requirement of total unity in upholding the agreed policies. The highest body within the MSZMP was the party Congress, which convened every five years. When the Congress was not in session, the Central Committee of the MSZMP was the highest body. Because the Central Committee met twice a year, most day-to-day duties and responsibilities were vested in the Politburo. The party leader was the de facto chairman of the Politburo and a de facto chief executive of Hungary. At various points he served as the prime minister in addition to being party leader.

Overview
The party supported the revolution, but turned against Imre Nagy's government after he denounced the Warsaw Pact. The party formed a 'Revolutionary Peasant-Worker Government' that took over the country, with Soviet support, on 4 November 1956.

Gradually, however, the new government instituted goulash Communism, a somewhat more humane way of governing than had prevailed under Mátyás Rákosi. Under Kádár's mantra of "he who is not against us is with us," Hungarians generally had more freedom than their Eastern Bloc counterparts to go about their daily lives. For example, his government executed only 350 people after the 1956 revolution. The government also gave limited freedom to the workings of the market via the New Economic Mechanism. However, it retained a monopoly of political power, and subjected the media to censorship that was fairly onerous by Western standards.  The National Assembly, like its counterparts in the rest of the Soviet bloc, continued to rubber-stamp decisions already made by the MSZMP leadership. It was the dominant component of the Patriotic People's Front, a popular front that included some non-Communists. However, all prospective candidates had to accept the Front's program in order to stand. Indeed, Kádár and his close advisers used the Front to weed out candidates they deemed unacceptable.

Kádár retired on 22 May 1988 and was succeeded by Prime Minister Károly Grósz. However, Grósz soon found himself eclipsed by a group of radical reformers who favored establishing a market economy. On 28 January 1989, young Politburo member and minister of state Imre Pozsgay announced during an interview with the radio program 168 Hours that the Poliburo's historical sub-committee regarded the events of 1956 as a 'people's uprising'. This announcement, not approved in advance by the Politburo, provoked and catalyzed various developments within the party, and brought about sudden and ever-escalating changes that, within nine months, resulted in the ending of Communism in Hungary and the dissolution of the MSZMP.

By the summer of 1989, the MSZMP was no longer a Marxist–Leninist party, and the radical reformers, led by Prime Minister Miklós Németh, Foreign Minister Gyula Horn, Rezső Nyers, and Pozsgay, had taken over the party machinery. On 26 June 1989, the Central Committee was renamed the Political Executive Committee, and the Politburo was replaced by a four-man collective presidency chaired by Nyers. Although Grósz remained general secretary, Nyers now outranked him. On 7 October 1989 the MSZMP was dissolved and refounded as the Hungarian Socialist Party, a Western-style social democratic party.  Two weeks later, the National Assembly approved numerous amendments to the constitution that purged it of its Marxist–Leninist character, ending one-party rule in Hungary.

A small Communist faction, centred on Károly Grósz, opposed these reforms and broke away to form the Hungarian Communist Workers' Party on 17 December 1989.

Leaders of the Hungarian Socialist Workers' Party

First/General Secretaries

Chairman of the Presidency of the Political Executive Committee

Electoral history

National Assembly elections

See also 
Gyula Horn
Imre Pozsgay
List of political parties in Hungary
Miklós Németh
Politics of Hungary

References

Notes

1956 establishments in Hungary
1989 disestablishments in Hungary
Communist parties in Hungary
Defunct political parties in Hungary
Hungarian People's Republic
Hungarian Revolution of 1956
Hungary–Soviet Union relations
Organizations of the Revolutions of 1989
Parties of one-party systems
Political parties disestablished in 1989
Political parties established in 1956
Formerly ruling communist parties